The 2017–18 season is Barnet's 130th year in existence and third consecutive season in League Two. Along with competing in League Two, the club also participate in the FA Cup, EFL Cup and EFL Trophy.

Transfers

Transfers in

Transfers out

Loans in

Loans out

Competitions

Friendlies
As of 14 July 2017, Barnet have announced six pre-season friendlies against Swansea City, Braintree Town, West Ham United Under-23s, Maidstone United, Millwall and Concord Rangers.

League Two

League table

Result summary

Results by matchday

Matches
On 21 June 2017, the league fixtures were announced.

FA Cup
On 16 October 2017, Barnet were drawn away to Blackburn Rovers in the first round.

EFL Cup
On 16 June 2017, Barnet were drawn away to Peterborough United in the first round. Another away tie against Brighton & Hove Albion was confirmed for the second round.

EFL Trophy
On 12 July 2017, the group stage draw was made with Barnet facing AFC Wimbledon, Luton Town and Tottenham Hotspur U23s in Southern Group F.

Squad information

Appearances
Correct as of 5 May 2018

Goalscorers
Correct as of 5 May 2018

References

Barnet
Barnet F.C. seasons